Peter Kracke (1 June 1943 – 15 November 1993) was a German professional footballer who played as a striker. He spent one season in the Bundesliga with Borussia Mönchengladbach.

Honours
Borussia Mönchengladbach
 Bundesliga: 1969–70

References

External links
 

1943 births
1993 deaths
People from Velbert
Sportspeople from Düsseldorf (region)
German footballers
Association football forwards
Bundesliga players
Ligue 1 players
Borussia Mönchengladbach players
1. FC Saarbrücken players
Angoulême Charente FC players
German expatriate footballers
German expatriate sportspeople in France
Expatriate footballers in France
Footballers from North Rhine-Westphalia